Sheerness Lifeboat Station is an RNLI station located in the town of Sheerness on the Isle of Sheppey in the English county of Kent. The station is on the north coast of the county, strategically placed at the mouth of the River Medway and close the busy Thames estuary. It is a relatively new station only being established in 1969 when a lifeboat was stationed in the Harbour.

Evaluation
In 1969 the Institution decided to send a lifeboat - the Ernest William and Elizabeth Ellen Hinde (ON 1017) - to Sheerness for evaluation. Following a successful appraisal the RNLI decided to establish a permanent station in 1971.

Fleet

All weather lifeboats

Inshore lifeboats

References

Lifeboat stations in Kent
Sheerness